Patrick Périon (born 6 February 1967) is a French football manager and former player who is the head coach of French club CS Mulhouse Bourtzwiller. As a player, he played as a defender.

Honours 
Mulhouse

 Division 2: 1988–89

References 

1967 births
Living people
Footballers from Mulhouse
French footballers
French football managers
Association football defenders
INF Vichy players
FC Mulhouse players
Gazélec Ajaccio players
SO Châtellerault players
FC Balagne players
French Division 3 (1971–1993) players
Ligue 2 players
Ligue 1 players
Championnat National players